Łukasz Łakomy (born 18 January 2001) is a Polish professional footballer who plays as a midfielder for Zagłębie Lubin.

Career statistics

Club

References

External links

2001 births
Living people
People from Puławy
Polish footballers
Association football midfielders
Legia Warsaw II players
Legia Warsaw players
Zagłębie Lubin players
III liga players
Ekstraklasa players
Poland youth international footballers
Poland under-21 international footballers